Yevgeni Vasilyevich Zakharchenko (born 21 September 1978) is a former Russian professional footballer.

External links
 

1978 births
People from Pyatigorsk
Living people
Russian footballers
Association football midfielders
FC Dynamo Stavropol players
FC Okzhetpes players
FC Kyzylzhar players
Kazakhstan Premier League players
Russian expatriate footballers
Expatriate footballers in Kazakhstan
Russian expatriate sportspeople in Kazakhstan
Sportspeople from Stavropol Krai
FC Volga Ulyanovsk players